The 2014–15 FA Trophy Final was the 46th final of the Football Association's cup competition for levels 5–8 of the English football league system. The match was contested between North Ferriby United of the Conference North (level 6) and Wrexham of the Conference Premier (level 5). Wrexham won the competition in 2013 while North Ferriby made their first final appearance, having never previously gone past the quarter-final stage.

North Ferriby United won the game 5–4 on penalties.

Match

Details

FA Trophy Finals
North Ferriby United A.F.C. matches
Fa Trophy Final 2015
Fa Trophy Final
Fa Trophy Final
Fa Trophy Final
Events at Wembley Stadium
Fa Trophy Final 2015